Union Township is a subdivision of Ste. Genevieve County, Missouri, in the United States of America, and is one of the five townships located in Ste. Genevieve County.

Name

The origin of the name is not certain, but may be connected to President Andrew Jackson's championship of national unity.

History

Union Township was formed in 1834 out of the western portion of Jackson Township.

Populated places

There are several communities in Union Township.  The only incorporated community, Grayhawk, has a population of 408.

Grayhawk
Jonca
Sprott

The township also contains 6 churches: Chestnut Ridge Baptist Church, Fairview Church, Genevieve Church, Little Vine Church, Salem Church, and Three Rivers Baptist Church, as well as the following cemeteries: Doss, Haile, Jenning, Mackley, McClintock, McGee, Murphy, and Oakland.

Geography

Union Township is located in the western portion of Ste. Genevieve County.
A number of streams run through the township: Bear Creek, Hickory Creek, North Fork Jonca Creek, and South Fork Jonca Creek.  The following lakes are found in the township: Erb Lake, Hart Lake, Lake Genevieve, Lake Ocie, Lake Wanda Lee, Lake Ski, Tragden Lake, and Trautman Lake.

Demographics

2000 census
The 2000 census shows Union Township consisting of 2,596 individuals.  The racial makeup of the town was 2,555 (98.42%) White, 10 (0.38%) African American, 23 (0.88%) Native American and Alaska Native, 2 (0.07%) Asian, and 6 (0.23%) from two or more races.

2010 census
As of the census of 2010, there were 1,399 housing units consisting of 2,779 people, with a population density of 30.5 per square mile residing in the township. Males number 1,294 and make up 50.3% of the population, while females number 1,278 and make up 49.7%.  The median age for men is 30.8 years and for women is 37.9.  The racial makeup of the town was 2,738 (98.52)% White, 11 (0.40%) African American, 13 (0.47%) Native American and Alaska Native, 1 (0.04%) Asian, and 7 (0.25%) from other races, and 9 (0.32%) from two or more races.

The average household size 2.79 persons.  The estimated median household income in 2009 was $43,429 ($36,425 in 1999). 13% of the residents have an income below the poverty rate.

Other Union townships
The Geographic Names Information System (GNIS) records 33 townships named Union in various counties of Missouri.

References

Geography of Ste. Genevieve County, Missouri
Townships in Missouri